Fritillaria walujewii is a species of flowering plant in the lily family Liliaceae, native to Kazakhstan, Kyrgyzstan, and Xinjiang Province in western China.

It is a bulb-forming herbaceous perennial up to 50 cm tall. The flowers are hanging, bell-shaped, usually dark purple with white or darker purple markings but sometimes pale green.

The species is named in honor of P.A. von Walujew, one-time Russian Imperial Minister of the Interior.

References

External links
Pacific Bulb Society, Asian Fritillaria Four photos of several species including Fritillaria walujewii

walujewii
Flora of Asia
Plants described in 1879